Lokshen mit kaese,, also known as , Jewish mac and cheese, lokshen with cheese, or Jewish egg noodles with cottage cheese, is an Ashkenazi Jewish dish popular in the Jewish diaspora particularly in the United States, consisting of lokshen, or Jewish egg noodles that are served with a cheese sauce typically made with cottage cheese and black pepper, and sometimes farmers cheese may be used in place of the cottage cheese, and sour cream, butter, caramelized onions, garlic, tomatoes, mint, currants, parmesan, and other ingredients may be added. Sometimes a sweet variety is made with cinnamon sugar. It has been compared to a deconstructed noodle kugel and is considered by many to be a Jewish comfort food.

Etymology

Lokshen mit kaese comes from the almost identical Yiddish term for the dish, Lokshn mit kez, meaning Lokshen (Jewish egg noodles) with cheese.

History

According to the late Jewish culinary historian Rabbi Gil Marks, lokshen mit kaese originated more than 800 years ago in the Jewish communities of Eastern Europe sometime during the Middle Ages as a relative of the lokshen kugel, and was a relatively cheap meal for the then impoverished Jewish population of the shtetl. The Lithuanian Jews preferred a savory version of the dish seasoned with salt and pepper while the Polish Jews preferred a sweet version of the dish sprinkled with sugar and sometimes cinnamon. When Jews fled from the escalating antisemitism and pogroms in Eastern Europe and sought refuge in the United States and other countries in the Jewish diaspora, as well as in Israel, they brought this dish with them. Lokshen mit kaese remained popular in the American Jewish community, though beginning in the late 20th century it began to decrease in popularity due to a growing mistrust of saturated fat due to its possible health effects, and a general desire to move away from old-fashioned tastes.

Today lokshen mit kaese remains popular and is considered a comfort food comparable to macaroni and cheese for many American Jews, some of whom introduced new ingredients into the dish such as Italian pasta, butter, parmesan cheese, mint, cherry tomatoes and currants, among others.

Overview

Two main types of the dish exist, a savory and a sweet. Both are typically made with lokshen noodles along with cottage cheese, sour cream and sometimes butter. The savory version of lokshen mit kaese usually includes salt, pepper and caramelized onions. While the sweet version is topped with cinnamon and sugar similar to a noodle kugel. Melissa Clark makes a variation with mint, cherry tomatoes, scallions and dried currants.

Preparation

Lokshen mit kaese is typically prepared by boiling a variety of lokshen or Jewish egg noodles. Traditionally longer homemade lokshen egg noodles were and are still sometimes used, however store bought lokshen as well as varnishkes also known as bowtie pasta are a popular choice as well, sometime various shape of Italian pasta such as macaroni elbows are used as well. The Jewish egg noodles are boiled until al dente and then mixed with cottage or pot cheese, and sometime butter, cream cheese, parmesan cheese, shallots, garlic, chive, or other ingredients may be added, along with a fair amount of cracked black pepper. Sometimes it is made with broad lokshen and served with ketchup.

In popular culture

Lokshen mit kaese is used as a Yiddish slang phrase equivalent to hunky dory, or "everything is easy".
Lokshen mit kaese is mentioned in a song listing Jewish foods during the 2013 Broadway play When You're in Love the Whole World is Jewish by Jason Alexander, who has said the dish is a childhood favorite of his,  based on the 1963 comedy album by Bob Booker and George Foster.

See also

Lokshen kugel
Jewish penicillin
Kasha varnishkes
Ashkenazi Jewish cuisine
Kugel
Kugel yerushalmi
Shabbat meals

References

Ashkenazi Jewish cuisine
Israeli cuisine
Noodles
Types of pasta
Staple foods
Cheese dishes
Noodle dishes
Kugels
Jewish American cuisine
Jewish noodle dishes